Molchan, Molčan or Moltchan (Cyrillic: Молчан) is a surname. It is a less frequent form of the Ukrainian surname Movchan and is mainly found in Russia, Belarus, Ukraine, and Slovakia. 
 Russia: Molchan, less commonly Movchan
 Ukraine: Movchan, less commonly Molchan
 Czech Republic: Molčan, Molčanová (feminine)
 Slovakia: Molčan, Molčanová (feminine)
 Poland: Mołczan, Mowczan (from Ukrainian)

Notable people with the name include:
 Alex Molčan (born 1997), Slovak tennis player
 George Molchan (1922–2005), American spokesperson
 Vladislav Molchan (born 2000), Russian football player
 Youri Moltchan (born 1983), Russian foil fencer

See also 
 20570 Molchan, minor planet
 
 Movchan

References 

Russian-language surnames
Ukrainian-language surnames